Talking Marriage with Ryan Bailey is an American comedy web series created by married Los Angeles-based actor Ryan Bailey. It stars its creator as a combination talk show host/marriage counselor who seeks to pass on his words of wisdom for maintaining a happy state of matrimony, despite his own obvious ineptitude. Each episode contains guests playing fictionalized versions of themselves. The series is distributed via YouTube and airs biweekly, with 'web extras' (consisting of short skits, VLOGs, and commercials) featured on off-weeks.

Plot
Ryan Bailey is a self-styled talk show host and marriage expert who, thanks to his own experience of being 'happily married,' claims to possess the secrets of marriage needed to help others. Convinced that he is a kind of modern-day 'marriage prophet,' he launches his own series. However, Ryan's ambitions vastly outweigh his means to realize them, and as a result he films the show in his garage and relies on his often-reluctant friends to provide technical assistance. Ryan has a troubled relationship with his wife (who remains an unseen character), though he attempts to hide this reality from the crew members and audience. His position as a 'marriage advisor' allows him to ridicule others for their inadequacies, though all too often, his own shine through in the process.

Although Ryan's connections are dubious, he and his crew manage to lure celebrities to take part in the show as guests whom he then interviews. The means by which the celebrities have been induced to participate have included (to date) misinformation, blackmail, and kidnapping. On the rare occasions that a guest fails to materialize, the disappointment and shock is enough to send Ryan into a tailspin that only an impromptu musical number can cure.

Characters
Ryan (played by Ryan Bailey) - Overconfident and brash, he has a vastly-inflated self-image.
Evan (played by Evan Gaustad) - Ryan's best friend and soul mate (Ryan's words, not his), responsible for running the camera and coordinating the show (though Ryan claims credit for these duties).
Sean (played by Sean Persaud) - The beleaguered soundman of the show, whom Ryan often berates for real (but more often, imagined) infractions.
Josh (played by Joshua Meindertsma) - Something of a musical mascot, Josh serves no discernible purpose from a production standpoint, but provides the living, beating heart of the show with his ukulele playing. In episodes when he is not present, Ryan seems to become more unhinged.
Tiffany (played by Tiffany Elle) - A 'late addition' to the show (starting on episode 4), Tiffany joined the crew without any explanation of who she is or what purpose she serves... but is an invaluable part of the Talking Marriage team!!
Brooklyn (played by herself) - Ryan's dog, often seen (but rarely heard) during the episodes.

Episodes

Season 1 (2014)

Season 2 (2014)

Season 3 (2015)

Live show
On January 28, 2015, Ryan and the full cast of Talking Marriage performed a special 'Live Show', Talking Marriage with Ryan Bailey LIVE!, at the UCB Sunset Theatre in Los Angeles, CA. The Live Show was directed by Nic Wegener, and featured Suzy Henschel, who played a friend of Ryan's wife (to date, Henschel has not appeared in a regular Talking Marriage episode).

References

External links
 
 

American comedy web series
Internet properties established in 2014
2014 establishments in California